James C. Wilson (October 8, 1900 – January 31, 1995) was a long-distance motorcyclist and author of the autobiography Three-Wheeling Through Africa. His five-month 1927 journey from Nigeria to Eritrea on a Triumph sidecar with Francis Flood may have been the first motorized crossing of Africa by motorcycle.

After a United States tour in the late 1930s promoting his travels and book, Wilson resided in Polk, Nebraska where he was a corn farmer.

Photographs he published in National Geographic were used in a 21st century MIT anthropology course.

Bibliography

References

Sources

Long-distance motorcycle riders
1900 births
1995 deaths